Icacina is a genus of flowering plants belonging to the family Icacinaceae.

Its native range is Cape Verde, Western Tropical Africa to South Sudan and Angola.

Species:

Icacina claessensii 
Icacina guessfeldtii 
Icacina mannii  (mutuo)
Icacina oliviformis  (false yam)
Icacina trichantha  (urumbia, eriagbo, gbegbe)

References

Icacinaceae
Asterid genera